Miami Dade College (Miami Dade, MDC or Dade) is a public college in Miami, Florida. Founded in 1959, it has a total of eight campuses and twenty-one outreach centers throughout Miami-Dade County. It is the largest college in the Florida College System with more than 100,000 students and is the second-largest college or university in the United States. The college enrolls a significantly larger amount of Hispanic students, compared to other colleges and universities in the state of Florida.

History 
Initially established on the farm of a county high school, Dade County Junior College and later, Miami Dade Community College—as it was formerly known—had its modest beginnings. Like most organizations at the time, it was a segregated institution. It wasn't until 1962 that desegregation took full effect; black and white students could share full schedules together. In 1963, the first new building was constructed, and Peter Masiko would become president for the next 18 years. As the years progressed, more campuses began opening across the county: the Kendall Campus and Wolfson Campus.

Initially, the college had an open admissions policy, meaning anyone who could afford to pay was allowed to study at the campus. Due to this, the college aimed to improve its academic stance among alumni. To encourage this movement, a Medical Center was built for students in Allied Health and Nursing (RN) programs. As the number of Cuban exiles and refugees began to rise in 1980, and outreach center was built in the city of Hialeah. This allowed refugees and immigrants educational opportunities that they wouldn't be able to achieve otherwise. Another outreach center, the InterAmerican center, was built to accommodate bilingual education. The Homestead Campus was built in 1990 in Homestead to relieve the concerns of students having to drive to the Kendall Campus In Miami. In the mid-1990s, the college began to rely heavily on the Miami Dade College Foundation as the Florida legislature reduced the state's education budget. The college also had to figure out new ways of recruiting students and it began its "Successful Alumni" campaign in the late 1990s, marketing the success of the college's alumni to local prospective students.

Beginning in 2001, the college implemented a strategic plan to revamp the college and its recruiting goals. In 2002, the college disbanded its Honors Program and created The Honors College for talented high school graduates. The Honors College is a representation of Miami Dade College's most academically-gifted students in different fields and was originally based on the three larger campuses (Wolfson, Kendall, and North).In 2006, Miami Dade College surpassed 1.5 million students enrolled throughout its history. In 2007, The Honors College expanded into the Eduardo J. Padron Campus (formerly - InterAmerican Campus) with The Honors College Dual Language Honors Program to tailor to the needs of the growing Spanish-speaking population in the United States as well as abroad. The Dual Language Honors Program opened its doors to bilingual students who wish to continue their careers with professional fluency in the English and Spanish languages. In 2009, The MDC Honors College Dual Language Program earned the merit of Innovation of the Year in the Learning and Teaching Department from the League for Innovation. The Honors College continues to expand and will open its fifth campus at Miami Dade College Homestead Campus Fall 2022. In 2018, Miami Dade was awarded and recognized for its path to economic and social mobility by the Aspen Institute. The award received was the $1 million Aspen Prize.

In 2021, Eduardo Padron was succeeded by Madeline Pumariega as president of the college. He had held the position since 1995.

Miami Dade College has eight campuses and two centers, with its main campus being the Wolfson Campus in downtown Miami. These eight campuses and various outreach centers are located throughout Miami-Dade County. The Honors College is currently represented on five campuses, with a bilingual program (English-Spanish) at the Padron Campus.  All campuses have different schools for various disciplines (engineering, business, etc.). Some campuses also operate dual-enrollment programs for high school students. Most campuses also have College Preparatory or English as a Second Language (ESL) courses that help students pass the Computerized Placement Test (CPT) that is required for admittance and proves prospective students are qualified to take college-level mathematics and English courses

North Campus  
North Campus has specialized programs that train future firefighters, police officers, and Emergency medical service personnels. It also has a School of Entertainment and Design Technology. This campus partners with Florida Agricultural and Mechanical University (FAMU) for engineering programs. The North Campus operates the Carrie Meek Entrepreneurial Education Center in Liberty City. The campus also offers a Bachelor in Applied Science degree in Public Safety that is housed within the School of Justice.

Kendall Campus 
Kendall Campus houses the College's athletic teams. The 185-acre campus opened in 1967. It is home to the Honors College and the Miami Dade College Foundation. Apart from the Latin Jazz experience being held at the Kendall Campus they also allow students to receive community service hours that can be apply to their degree through the CSI and Procedural Justice Camps for the youth, including those with disabilities.

Wolfson Campus 

The Wolfson Campus was opened in 1970 and is the only comprehensive urban campus in the city. Located within the city's financial, governmental, technological and cultural hubs, Wolfson educates over 27,000 students each year. MDC's Wolfson Campus program is designed Accelerate, Retain, Complete with Opportunities and Support and is aimed at creating a support network for 600 STEM students. Each year, this campus hosts the Miami Book Fair International, the nation's largest literary festival. The Miami Culinary Institute of Miami Dade College is located in this campus where it offers a Chefs Apprentice Program, Culinary Arts Management and an Associate in science. It is a multi-million dollar architectural project.

The goal is to keep Hispanic and other low-income high-need students engaged in the program. The campus has two art galleries, a library, and two computer courtyards. The Wolfson Campus also has business and paralegal studies programs.

Medical Center 
Miami Dade College opened its medical campus in 1977. It is located in Miami's Medical District near downtown Miami, trains students in the Nursing (BSN/RN) and Allied Health fields, completing the Associate in Applied Science and school degree that will allow them immediate entry into health professions. The Medical Campus also offers bachelor's degrees. The campus shares its complex with The University of Miami's School of Medicine, Jackson Memorial Hospital, Veterans Administration Hospital and Miami Dade College Public Health Service This campus also offers a simulation hospital which includes 8 medical surgical rooms, 2 OB rooms, 2 pediatric rooms, 9 debriefing rooms, 1 operating room, 1 simulated ambulance, 10 exam rooms and 1 apartment as well as 17 high fidelity human patient simulators.

The Homestead Campus contains the college's aviation program, one of thirteen schools in the nation accredited ATC-CTI (Air Traffic Control Collegiate Training Initiative) status by the Federal Aviation Administration (FAA). It also possesses, in addition to the Medical Campus, the Benjamin Leon School of Nursing that has trained over fifty percent of nurses in Miami-Dade County.

Eduardo J. Padrón Campus 
Eduardo J. Padrón Campus is the sixth campus created by Miami Dade College. It was previously known as the InterAmerican campus, but was later changed to Eduardo J Padrón in honor of MDC's president being with the college for 50 years. This campus was first created in 1972, but didn't get the status of a "campus" til March 27, 2001. This campus contains the School of Education which offers Bachelor of Science (BS) degrees.

New World School of the Arts 
The New World School of the Arts is both a high school and a college that focuses on visual arts, theatre, dance, and music. Admission requirements include an audition or review of the applicant's art portfolio. Aside from New World School of the Arts and the MEEC, there are nineteen other MDC outreach centers.

Hialeah Campus 
The Hialeah Campus is a former extension of the North Campus, houses a large and comprehensive English language training program for speakers of other languages in various instructional formats. Construction of a 1,000 car parking garage and a new building housing classrooms, science labs, and student services was completed in 2014. The Hialeah Campus offers associate programs and the Bachelor of Applied Science in Supervision and Management. The campus has two buildings: Building 1 has four floors, and visitors will find the library, bookstore, Public safety office, cafeteria, Student Services, Student Life, Network and Media Services, testing department, and some classrooms.  The second building houses faculty offices, wet labs, and the majority of classrooms.

Established in 2007 by two faculty advisors Ivonne Lamazares and Victor Calderin, Café Cultura  is the Hialeah Campus's literary magazine. Café Cultura members collect student works of poetry, fiction, and visual arts, to name a few, and publish the content. This is a year long process and new editions are published every Fall semester. Café Cultura is the recipient of the Columbia Scholastic Press Association Golden Circle national award  and is the recipient of other notable recognitions at the state level .

The Hialeah Campus also has an academic mentorship program unique to the campus named S.C.H.O.L.A.R.S. (Service-Centered, Holistic Opportunities for Learning, Achievement, Retention and Success) . SCHOLARS' core values are empathy, leadership, communication and teamwork. This program focuses on the first year student experience by assigning a peer mentor who can help students navigate the college experience, volunteer in their community, and become changemakers .

West Campus 
West Campus opened in March 2006 for students residing in or near Doral. The campus had begun construction on a new 5 story garage in January 2012; in October of the same year, the garage collapsed, this collapse resulted in the death of 4 construction workers. In 2015 the contractors and subcontractors involved in the project reached an agreement with Miami Dade College in the amount of 33.5 million dollars. This Fall, West Campus collaborated with Tesla Start, a program made for students looking to start a career in Tesla as a field technician. If passed, students will have a guaranteed position as a Field Technician as long as they accept within 30-days of completion.

Carrie P. Meek Entrepreneurial Educational Center 
The Carrie P. Meek Entrepreneurial Educational Center is an outreach center founded in 1989. It is named after the first African-American woman in the Florida senate, Carrie P. Meek. The Carrie Meek Foundation Scholarship Program supports the MDC Entrepreneurial Educational Center campus based in Liberty City, Miami. This is an institution based on offering young people the best possible education, mainly to impoverished neighborhoods. This campus offers college credit courses but focuses on non-credit courses and vocational programs, seminars, and workshops to train people for employment.

Academics 
Out of approximately 100,000 students, on average, almost 6,000 go on to earn a bachelor's degree, associate degrees, vocational, technical, or college credit certificates. Associate in Arts transfer students from Miami Dade College go on to transfer primarily to schools within the State University System of Florida. Although, some do transfer to out-of-state institutions, mainly through articulation agreements made between institutions. As a student in Miami Dade College, they are able to pursue an Associate or bachelor's degrees in over 70 majors with the option of also taking part in non-credit courses. Students also have the opportunity to enroll in the honors program.

Although students are offered a wide variety of majors, there are currently a list of top three majors in Miami Dade College which include Liberal Arts, Humanities, Nursing, and Business. Allied Health Professions and Computer Information Systems follow these majors, naming them in the top five majors chosen by students.

In 2010, Miami Dade College's Schools of Engineering and Technology that develops students to researchers, used a million-plus U.S. dollars grant from the National Science Foundation to start a computer laboratory used by students so they can apply their skills in resolving real-life-problems.

In fall of 2019, the college implemented the Tesla START program for the purpose of teaching students how to become electric vehicle technicians.

In the Fall semester of 2019, Miami Dade College implemented a learning degree for students to gain a College Credit or Associate in Science in Cybersecurity.

The Inside Out Prison Exchange Program that MDC offers, intends to bring college students together and inmates for a semester-long learning at Everglades Correctional Institution.

In the graduation year of 2016 in Miami Dade College, 13,351 degrees were awarded between undergraduate and graduate programs with majority of the recipients being Hispanic. The degrees were awarded to 59.9% of women while they were awarded to a percentage of 40.1% of men.

Tuition and Fees by College Credit Program. $118.22 per credit hour for Resident Students, and $402.51 per credit hour for Non-Resident Students. Total Tuition per term (12 credits): $1,558.68 for Resident Students and $6,431.64 for Non-Resident Students. For completed an AA degree is with a total 60 credit that is an estimated around $7,093.02 for Resident Student and $24,156.06 for Non-Resident Student.

Enrollment

 School for Advanced Studies (SAS): A limited admission opportunity for Miami-Dade Public School students. High school classes are held at Kendall, Hialeah, Wolfson, and North Campus alongside regular college credit courses, and students choose three college classes per semester to take in place of traditional high school electives. College books and tuition are paid for by the county, and there is no cost to students. Bus service is also provided throughout the county to the schools. The goal is to allow students to earn their Associate in Arts and Associate in Science degree while earning their high school diploma. SAS is the 15th best high school in the nation, and is repeatedly one of the highest ranking high schools. MDC also has a virtual college, where a degree can be attained completely over the internet.
 Dual Enrollment: The college offers Dual Enrollment for students who currently are attending Miami-Dade County public high school, private high schools,  or home school. Dual enrollment allows students to enroll in a college course. The credits that are gained will be used toward both high school graduation and are accepted toward an Associate or bachelor's degree at Miami Date college.
Miami Dade Honors College: Beginning in May 2019, Miami Dade College decided to team up with the University of Miami to provide more enrollment opportunities for student. They now have a 10-year agreement, "This partnership ensures MDC students continue to have access to quality and affordable higher education," said MDC's Executive VP and Provost Dr. Lenore Rodicio. This agreement will guarantee Miami Dade Honors College students acceptance and merit-based financial support at the University of Miami if they meet transfer requirements. This 10-year agreement will run until May 31, 2028. The enrollment for the fall semester will be limited to 300 MDC students. The enrollment for the spring semester will be limited to 150 MDC transfers.

Total Enrollment (all undergraduate)

Financial Aid 
MDC offers many scholarships and financial aid. Under the financial aid we have Pell Grants, Student Loans. The average reported annual net price for Miami Dade College for students receiving grants or scholarship aid was $7,062 in 2017/2018.

Athletics
Miami Dade College competes in five sports, men's basketball, men's baseball, women's basketball, women's softball, and women's volleyball. In total, they have 85 student athletes made up of 38 men and 47 women.

Miami Dade's Baseball team program started in 1962. Although at the time, Kendall campus, North campus, and Wolfson campus had their own individual fielded teams. However, once the school changed to a four-year college from a community college, they united to make a baseball team.

Miami Dade college's athletic teams have won 35 NJCAA national titles, 15 in women's sports.

The school's athletic teams competed in the Southern Conference of the Florida State College Activities Association, a body of the National Junior College Athletic Association Region 8. Due to their players and good ranking, Miami Dade College was a "can't miss stop" for MLB scouts.

Arts and culture 

Miami Dade College has been collecting art at its individual campuses since the 1960s. Over the years, the collection has grown to more than 1,600 works in all mediums and genres, including painting, sculpture, works on paper, photography, video, film, installation and public sculpture. MDC Hialeah Campus opened an Art Gallery in late 2018 in Hialeah, Florida. MDC Hialeah Campus Arts & Cultural Programs are partially supported by The John S. and James L. Knight Foundation.

The college has an "Emerging Artist Annual Exhibition" which allows student to display their art in the "Art + Design" museum. Miami Dade College also has an "MDC live Art" event which allows student to perform on stage and inspire others through their performance of art; both are open to the community. As a matter of fact, MDC North campus is home to a prestigious collection of sculptures produced by renowned artists such as Alfredo Halegna, Rafael Consuegra, William King and Mario Felipe Almaguer.

Annually since 1964, Miami Dade College has awarded the Francis Wolfson Art Scholarship. More than 200 students from Miami Dade College and its outreach center, the New School of the Arts, have received this scholarship. The winners in 2018 each received $1,500.

Notable alumni

Notable administrators and faculty
Joanna Falco-Leshin, professor of English and Humanities

References

External links

 

 
1959 establishments in Florida
Air traffic controller schools
Educational institutions established in 1959
Florida College System
North American Soccer League (1968–1984) stadiums
Universities and colleges accredited by the Southern Association of Colleges and Schools
Universities and colleges in Miami-Dade County, Florida